Abbas Anvari is an Iranian Professor in Physics. He has a Ph.D. in physics from Chalmers University of Technology, Sweden.  He served as the chancellor of Sharif University of Technology for two terms: 1980–1982 and 1985–1989.

References

|-

|-

Academic staff of Sharif University of Technology
Chancellors of the Sharif University of Technology
Chalmers University of Technology alumni
Iranian physicists
Living people
Year of birth missing (living people)